Gary Kovacs (born 1963 or 1964) is a San Francisco Bay Area technologist. He was the chief executive officer of AVG Technologies.   Kovacs has worked for Mozilla Corporation, Adobe, SAP, and IBM, and led Zi Corporation, a mobile text messaging company.

Early life 

Kovacs was born in Toronto, Ontario, Canada, to Ruby (né Kiraly) and Janos (John) Kovacs. Kovacs's father was a Hungarian refugee who fled to Canada in 1956.

Kovacs attended the University of Calgary's Haskayne School of Business, earning a BComm in 1990 and an MBA in 1999.

Career 

Kovacs spent more than 25 years in software and mobile technology. In addition to his undergraduate and graduate business degrees, Kovacs is a certified communications electronics technologist.

Kovacs joined IBM in 1990, where he held leadership positions in product management, sales, marketing, and operations, eventually serving as Worldwide Program Director for the software division, based in New York.

After 10 years at IBM, Kovacs became President of Zi Corporation, a company that pioneered predictive text, among other mobile search and text input solutions.  From 2000 to 2003, he helmed the company's successful creation and growth and provided strategic direction for its worldwide expansion.

Kovacs moved to Macromedia in 2003, working as Vice President of Product Marketing. When Adobe acquired Macromedia in 2005, Kovacs became vice president and general manager of product management and marketing for Adobe's mobile and devices division, rising to General Manager of the entire division in 2008.

From 2009 to 2010, Kovacs served as Senior Vice President of Markets, Solutions, and Products at Sybase, through its acquisition by SAP.

After an extensive search for a new CEO in 2010, Mozilla selected Kovacs to replace former CEO John Lilly. Kovacs led the overall direction of the organization and the Firefox web browser.

During Kovacs' tenure Mozilla expanded into the mobile market with the launch of Firefox OS, its open mobile operating system. Kovacs previewed Firefox OS at Mobile World Congress 2013, garnering commitments from 18 major worldwide mobile operators.

In 2012, Kovacs negotiated a reported $1 billion deal renewing Mozilla's agreement to make Google the default search engine in Firefox.

Most notably, Firefox now offers Collusion, an add-on that enables users to view all third parties tracking their online activity, and in turn, to make more informed decisions about being tracked.  The Ponemon Institute named Mozilla the "Most Trusted Internet Company For Privacy" for 2012.

Kovacs is a frequent public speaker and panel member. His 2012 TED talk  "Tracking the Trackers" explores issues of Internet privacy in an increasingly connected world.  At the World Economic Forum Annual Meeting of the New Champions in 2012, he presented on strategies for creating a resilient cyber economy amid economic, security, and privacy obstacles. He was a keynote speaker at the Mobile World Congress 2013.

Fierce Wireless named Kovacs one of the Rising Stars in Wireless for 2013.

In April 2013 Mozilla announced that he would step down as CEO of the corporation later that year and until March 2014 he was part of Mozilla's board of directors.

On July 30, 2013, Kovacs joined AVG Technologies as CEO. In September 2016, AVG Technologies was acquired by Avast Software for US$1.3B.
Kovacs employment with AVG Technologies was terminated in December 2016 upon completion of the acquisition.

On Dec. 11, 2018, Kovacs was appointed as CEO of Accela. Accela, which supplies regulatory software to government clients, was acquired by Berkshire Partners LLC, on Sep 28, 2017.

Personal life 
Raised by Hungarian parents in Toronto, Kovacs began experimenting with technology at a young age. Though grateful for the opportunities and education provided by his native Canada, his interest in innovation drew him to the San Francisco Bay Area.

He now lives in Piedmont, California.

References

External links
 Gary Kovacs bio at Wayback Machine (Mozilla.org)
 Gary Kovacs announced as CEO of AVG Technologies
 
 

1960s births
Living people
Businesspeople from Toronto
Canadian people of Hungarian descent
Canadian technology chief executives
Mozilla people
Open source people
University of Calgary alumni